The Dream Academy were a British band consisting of singer/guitarist Nick Laird-Clowes, multi-instrumentalist (chiefly oboe, cor anglais player) Kate St John, and keyboardist Gilbert Gabriel. The band is most noted for their 1985 hit singles "Life in a Northern Town", "The Love Parade" and their 1985 cover of the Smiths' song "Please Please Please Let Me Get What I Want", which was featured in the John Hughes film Ferris Bueller's Day Off in 1986.

History
Laird-Clowes and Gabriel met each other in the late 1970s whilst the former was in a band called The Act. Their idea was to create a songscape different from the power pop groups popular at the time in the UK, by mixing instruments and sounds that had been rarely done prominently before, such as strings, woodwinds, percussion (timpani) and synthesizers. At first, Laird-Clowes and Gabriel called themselves the Politics of Paradise.

Laird-Clowes met Kate St John (then of The Ravishing Beauties) at a party and asked her to join his band. The trio settled on the name The Dream Academy and shopped their demos for nearly two years. Their work was rejected by every record label before they finally landed a recording contract with Warner Bros. Records in 1985. Along the way, they made connections with Adam Peters and Pink Floyd's David Gilmour, a friend of Laird-Clowes. Gilmour would go on to produce and/or play on two of their albums and co-write one Dream Academy song, "Twelve-Eight Angel".

The band's first single, "Life in a Northern Town" was a worldwide success and sizeable hit in the U.S., charting at No. 7 on the Billboard Hot 100 chart, from an album co-produced by Gilmour. The song also made number 15 in the UK Singles Chart. The single was dedicated to the English singer-songwriter Nick Drake. It was their only major chart success, though the follow up single "The Love Parade" achieved moderate success in the United States.

The band launched a worldwide promotional tour based on the chart success of "Life in a Northern Town" and appeared on the television programmes Saturday Night Live, The Tonight Show, American Bandstand (with Dick Clark), MTV (interview with J. J. Jackson), and Top of the Pops. The Dream Academy's eponymous debut album also reached a wide audience in the U.S.  Their two subsequent albums did not match their initial success.

The band toured once, in 1991. During the same year, Gabriel and St John decided to leave the group to pursue solo musical interests and projects. Laird-Clowes ultimately decided that he would not go further under the Dream Academy name.

On 27 October 2016, Laird-Clowes and St John, accompanied by keyboardist Maxwell Cooke and drummer/percussionist Daisy Palmer, performed three shows in Japan.

On 4 February 2017, Laird-Clowes and St John—again accompanied by Max Cooke—performed a 13-song acoustic set at The Tabernacle, Talgarth, Wales.

Discography

Studio albums

Compilation albums

Singles

Notes

See also
List of folk rock artists
List of performers on Top of the Pops

References

External links
VH1 artist page

British folk rock groups
British indie pop groups
English new wave musical groups
Musical groups established in 1983
Musical groups disestablished in 1991
Blanco y Negro Records artists
Warner Records artists
Reprise Records artists
Musical groups from London
British musical trios